Mast-Jägermeister SE is a German liquor company owned by the Findel-Mast family. The corporate offices are located in Wolfenbüttel. Jägermeister is the primary product of Mast-Jägermeister SE. They also produce the lesser known SchlehenFeuer, a brand of sloe gin. In the past, they manufactured a multitude of liquors and liqueurs.

History 
Wilhelm Mast founded Mast-Jägermeister SE (then a KG) in Wolfenbüttel. His son Curt Mast developed the recipe for the herb flavored 70-proof (35%) liqueur Jägermeister, which he first brought to market in 1935. Günter Mast was the managing director for many years until his death in 2011.

Production 
Mast-Jägermeister SE produced 76.5 million 0.7 liter bottles in the financial year 2006 and grew by 15 percent in 2005. Most of the production (56.6 million) was exported to over 70 countries world-wide.

External links 
 Mast-Jägermeister SE - Enterprise web page

Distilleries in Germany
Companies based in Lower Saxony
German brands
Food and drink companies established in 1878
19th-century establishments in the Duchy of Brunswick
Wolfenbüttel